DnaJ homolog subfamily C member 3 is a protein that in humans is encoded by the DNAJC3 gene.

Function 

The protein encoded by this gene contains multiple tetratricopeptide repeat (TPR) motifs as well as the highly conserved J domain found in DNAJ chaperone family members. It is a member of the tetratricopeptide repeat family of proteins and acts as an inhibitor of the interferon-induced, dsRNA-activated protein kinase (PKR).

Clinical significance 

The DNAJC3 protein is an important apoptotic constituent. During a normal embryologic processes, or during cell injury (such as ischemia-reperfusion injury during heart attacks and strokes) or during developments and processes in cancer, an apoptotic cell undergoes structural changes including cell shrinkage, plasma membrane blebbing, nuclear condensation, and fragmentation of the DNA and nucleus. This is followed by fragmentation into apoptotic bodies that are quickly removed by phagocytes, thereby preventing an inflammatory response. It is a mode of cell death defined by characteristic morphological, biochemical and molecular changes. It was first described as a "shrinkage necrosis", and then this term was replaced by apoptosis to emphasize its role opposite mitosis in tissue kinetics. In later stages of apoptosis the entire cell becomes fragmented, forming a number of plasma membrane-bounded apoptotic bodies which contain nuclear and or cytoplasmic elements. The ultrastructural appearance of necrosis is quite different, the main features being mitochondrial swelling, plasma membrane breakdown and cellular disintegration. Apoptosis occurs in many physiological and pathological processes. It plays an important role during embryonal development as programmed cell death and accompanies a variety of normal involutional processes in which it serves as a mechanism to remove "unwanted" cells.

Moreover, an important role for DNAJC3 has been attributed to diabetes mellitus as well as multi system neurodegeneration. Diabetes mellitus and neurodegeneration are common diseases for which shared genetic factors are still only partly known. It was shown that loss of the BiP (immunoglobulin heavy-chain binding protein) co-chaperone DNAJC3 leads to diabetes mellitus and widespread neurodegeneration. Accordingly, three siblings were investigated with juvenile-onset diabetes and central and peripheral neurodegeneration, including ataxia, upper-motor-neuron damage, peripheral neuropathy, hearing loss, and cerebral atrophy. Subsequently, exome sequencing identified a homozygous stop mutation in DNAJC3. Further screening of a diabetes database with 226,194 individuals yielded eight phenotypically similar individuals and one family carrying a homozygous DNAJC3 deletion. DNAJC3 was absent in fibroblasts from all affected subjects in both families. To delineate the phenotypic and mutational spectrum and the genetic variability of DNAJC3, 8,603 exomes were further analyzed, including 506 from families affected by diabetes, ataxia, upper-motor-neuron damage, peripheral neuropathy, or hearing loss. This analysis revealed only one further loss-of-function allele in DNAJC3 and no further associations in subjects with only a subset of the features of the main phenotype. Notably, the DNAJC3 protein is also considered as an important marker for stress in the endoplasmatic reticulum.

Interactions 

DNAJC3 has been shown to interact with:
 EIF2AK2,
 EIF2AK3, and
 PRKRIR.

References

Further reading 

 
 
 
 
 
 
 
 
 
 
 

Heat shock proteins